AmericaSpeaks was a Washington, D.C.-based non-profit organization whose mission was to "engage citizens in the public decisions that impact their lives." AmericaSpeaks' work is focused on trying to create opportunities for citizens to impact decisions and to encourage public officials to make informed, lasting decisions.  AmericaSpeaks has developed and facilitated deliberative methods such as the 21st Century Town Hall Meeting, which enables facilitated discussion for 500 to 5,000 participants. Carolyn Lukensmeyer is the President and Founder of AmericaSpeaks. Its partners have included regional planning groups, local, state, and national government bodies, national and international organizations. Issues have ranged from Social Security reform, the redevelopment of ground zero in New York City and rebuilding New Orleans.

History 
AmericaSpeaks was founded in 1995. Since then, it has engaged over 130,000 people in over 50 large-scale forums in all 50 states and the District of Columbia. AmericaSpeaks aims to bring citizens together to deliberate about critical policy issues. The conclusions from these meetings are then brought to the attention of decision-makers in the hopes that citizen input will influence policy.

In 1994, after more than ten years of service in the public sector, AmericaSpeaks president Carolyn Lukensmeyer had grown concerned that citizens were increasingly being shut out of public decision-making processes. Carolyn traveled the United States and held vision meetings to conceptualize a model for large-scale citizen engagement forums, and a vision for how these forums could be used in national dialogues on key public policy issues.

AmericaSpeaks’ mission is to create innovative mechanisms through which citizens can enhance their voice in local, regional, and national governance, and to renew democracy through the development of a national infrastructure for democratic deliberation and citizen engagement.

In January 2014, AmericaSpeaks closed its doors.

21st Century Town Meeting 
AmericaSpeaks’ 21st Century Town Meeting is intended to create engaging, meaningful opportunities for citizens to participate in public decision making. This process attempts to update the traditional New England town meeting to address the needs of today's citizens, decision makers and democracy. Unlike most of New England's town meetings, however, it is not a formal legislative body, and therefore none of the decisions are binding.

The 21st Century Town Meeting marks a departure from traditional public participation methods, such as public hearings. The 21st Century Town Meeting focuses on discussion and deliberation among citizens rather than speeches, question-and-answer sessions or panel presentations. The purpose of the Town Hall Meeting is to gather diverse groups of citizens who will participate in round-table discussions (10-12 people per table) and deliberate in depth about key policy issues. Each table discussion is supported by a trained facilitator to keep participants on task. Participants receive discussion guides that present further information about the issues under consideration.

Technology collects the individual table discussions and the results are compiled into a set of collective recommendations. Each table submits ideas using wireless groupware computers and each participant can vote on specific proposals with keypad polling. These two pieces of technology allow for real-time reporting and voting. Results from discussions are presented to participants within minutes and polling results within seconds. The entire group votes on the final recommendations to submit to decision makers. Before the meeting ends, results from the meeting are put into a report, which is distributed to participants, decision makers and the news media as they leave.

21st Century Summit
The 21st Century Summit was created to help organization leaders tap into the collective wisdom of their constituents and stakeholders through large-scale meetings. During discussions, participants identify shared priorities and develop recommendations on essential policies and plans. At the meeting, AmericaSpeaks attempts to help attendees explore key issues, weigh critical trade offs, and deepen their connection and commitment to next steps. AmericaSpeaks has more than a decade of experience with engaging large numbers of members, employees or stakeholders – 50 to 5,000 at a single meeting – in a strategic, outcomes-oriented discussion. The method integrates recent technology with facilitated dialogue, and provides the tools to enable groups to examine important options and identify mutual priorities.

Notable examples 
AmericaSpeaks meetings address local, state and national decisions.

Americans Discuss Social Security
"Americans Discuss Social Security" was a 1998 non-partisan effort funded by The Pew Charitable Trusts, that directly engaged a diverse sample of Americans in a dialogue about Social Security reform and recommended that the United States Congress support legislation that reflected citizen preferences. Over fifteen months, the project engaged nearly 45,000 Americans in every state in direct discussions on Social Security reform and reached more than twelve million through the project's media and public education efforts.

Citizen Summits in Washington, DC
Beginning in 1999 and lasting until 2005, Mayor Anthony Williams partnered with AmericaSpeaks in an attempt to restore Washingtonians' faith in the government and gather recommendations for budgeting allocation. Over 13,500 citizens participated in seven 21st Century Town Meetings. Because of the Citizen Summits, millions of dollars were budgeted to areas over which citizens voiced concern, including: an additional $270 million for education; $10 million for senior services; 1,000 new drug treatment slots; an additional $25 million for a housing trust fund; $2 million for citizen involvement; and nearly $20 million for more police and juvenile-related initiatives.

Redeveloping Ground Zero
Listening to the City was held at the Javits Center in New York City in July 2002 to involve 4300 local citizens, who closely reflected the demographic diversity of the region, in the planning process for Ground Zero's future. Decision-makers from the Lower Manhattan Development Corporation and the Port Authority co-sponsored the meeting and incorporated it into their official public engagement process. After a day of intense deliberation, participants determined that the original plans for the redevelopment of the World Trade Center failed to meet the needs of the city. Within a week of Listening to the City, decision-makers announced that the plans would be redrawn in accordance with public priorities. A two-week online deliberation and dialogue reached another 800 New York City residents who reviewed the site options in small cyber groups.

Voices & Choices
AmericaSpeaks partnered with the Fund for Our Economic Future to organize a series of town meetings and public forums across northeast Ohio to enable thousands of people to come together to create a strategic plan for revitalizing the region's economy. One of the largest public deliberations convened, Voices & Choices combined a variety of approaches for mobilizing the region's citizenry, including one-on-one interviews, online forums and two large-scale 21st Century Town Meetings. Over 20,000 participants identified the region's strengths,  identified and prioritized its most important challenges and brainstormed solutions.

Unified New Orleans Plan
AmericaSpeaks partnered with the Unified New Orleans Plan to bring together nearly 4000 New Orleanians in two large-scale public meetings to develop and review elements of a citywide-plan for recovery.

Community Congress I (October 28, 2006) was held in the Morial Convention Center. AmericaSpeaks did not assist with the outreach for this meeting. The agenda for the meeting was to brief attendees on the state of city recovery. The first Community Congress drew attendees who were 75% white, and 40% of whom had incomes above $75,000, while the pre-Katrina demographics the city were 67% African-American and only 2% of New Orleanians had incomes above $75,000. The meeting was criticized for its unrepresentative participants and for some of its conclusions, which included backing a smaller footprint, and advising that funding should be concentrated on already recovering neighborhoods .

Community Congress II (December 2, 2006) and Community Congress III (January 20, 2007) were both held simultaneously in New Orleans and other American cities with the large numbers of Katrina evacuees (New Orleans diaspora). AmericaSpeaks partnered with the Unified New Orleans Plan to design, recruit participants and implement these meetings. When polled at the meetings, the participant groups closely approximated the pre-Katrina demographics of New Orleans: In pre-Katrina New Orleans, 67% were African-American and 37% had household income under $20,000; at Community Congress II, 64% were African-American and 25% had household income under $20,000; at Community Congress III, 55% were African-American and 24% had household income under $20,000. Renters, however, were significantly underrepresented - prior to Hurricane Katrina, 54% of the population were renters, while they made up only 29% of the participants . The meetings connected New Orleanians at home with friends and neighbors who have not yet made it home through the use of Internet webcast technology or closed circuit television. Unfortunately, ambiguously worded scenarios at the second Community Congress, particularly those that pertained to "areas of greatest need," caused some of the discussion results to be disregarded .

California Speaks
Nearly 3,500 Californians gathered in eight cities on August 11, 2007 in an interactive forum on
health care priorities called California Speaks, and 82 percent advocated major changes.

Our Budget, Our Econom
The AmericaSpeaks: Our Budget, Our Economy was politically neutral, which they tried to accomplish by assembling a diverse group of funders, a diverse National Advisory Committee, and selecting participants that were demographically representative in terms of race, age, income, and political orientation. Despite this, the event received criticism from both the right and the left.  Dean Baker, a left-leaning blogger, wrote that Our Budget, Our Economy materials would "guarantee" large cuts to Social Security and Medicare, while Fox News reported that the event was slanted toward raising taxes. There was also support for the national discussion, including this post from Craigslist founder Craig Newmark, as well as a piece from Harvard Professor Archon Fung.

The preliminary results of the June 26 discussion differed from Baker's predictions.  In a blog post, AmericaSpeaks President Carolyn Lukensmeyer detail the results presented to the National Commission on Fiscal Responsibility and Reform for its public meeting on Wednesday, June 30, 2010.

Advancing the Field of Deliberative Democracy 
AmericaSpeaks is dedicated to advancing citizen deliberation and aims to one day create an infrastructure in the United States that deeply incorporates citizens into the decision-making process. The Democracy Lab for Innovation and Research  is AmericaSpeaks’ think tank on deliberative democracy and citizen engagement. The Democracy Lab develops methods to advance and sustain citizen engagement in the public policy process. AmericaSpeaks formed the Democracy Lab in order to: Improve democratic processes and institutions by creating a new governance mechanism that will regularly convene diverse groups of Americans on key policy questions and incorporate citizen voices into policy making; Enhance and improve AmericaSpeaks’ approach to citizen engagement, such as developing new models for sustaining citizen participation and turning initial participation in deliberation into long-term citizen engagement and action; Evaluate the impact of AmericaSpeaks’ citizen engagement initiatives; Strengthen the deliberative democracy field by disseminating knowledge gained by AmericaSpeaks through its projects and research. AmericaSpeaks routinely brings together leading scholars and practitioners from the field of deliberative democracy to develop insights into and solutions for key questions in the field of citizen engagement.

See also 
Deliberative democracy
Participatory democracy
Public participation
Town hall meeting

References

Further reading 
 Meyers, L. (2003) ILR organizational change experts get ideas from NYC-Ground Zero town hall organizer Ithaca: Cornell Chronicle.
 Rossant, J. (2005)Putting Global Concerns to a Vote BusinessWeek.com
 Warner, C. (2007) Unified N.O. Plan gaining steam New Orleans: Times Picayune.
 Krupa, M. (2006) Survey backs plan for smaller footprint New Orleans: Times Picayune
 Unified New Orleans Plan Community Congress II Preliminary Report
 Williamson, A. (2007)  Citizen Participation in the Unified New Orleans Plan Harvard
 Cupka, M. (2008) Where Americans speak out about the issues AmericaSpeaks.com
 Brigham, S. (2006) Taking Democracy to a Regional Scale in Hamilton County. The Handbook of Large Group Methods: Creating Systemic Change in Organizations and Communities. (pp 231–245). San Francisco: Jossey-Bass.
 Leighninger, M. (2006). The Next Form of Democracy: How Expert Rule Is Giving Way to Shared Governance and Why Politics Will Never Be the Same. (pp 48, 66, 143-147). Nashville: Vanderbilt University Press.
 Epstein, P., Coates, P., Wray, L., Swain, D. (2006). Results that Matter: Improving Communities by Engaging Citizens, Measuring Performance, and Getting Things Done. (pp 28–29, 166-169, 200-201). San Francisco: Jossey-Bass.
 Nobel, P. (2005). Sixteen acres: architecture and the outrageous struggle for the future of Ground Zero. (pp 103–106). New York: Metropolitan Books, Henry Holt and Co.

External links 
 Deliberative Democracy Consortium
 Video highlights of 21st Century Town Meeting with the Unified New Orleans Plan, December 2006
 Craig Newmark Post Announcing AmericaSpeaks: Our Budget, Our Economy
 Archon Fung Post supporting AmericaSpeaks: Our Budget, Our Economy

Deliberative groups
Community building
Defunct political organizations of the United States
Non-profit organizations based in Washington, D.C.
Organizations established in 1995
Political organizations disestablished in 2014
Political science organizations